Cynthia Tafoya Calvillo  (born July 13, 1987) is an American mixed martial artist who competes in the strawweight and flyweight divisions of the Ultimate Fighting Championship. As of March 7, 2023, she is #15 in the UFC women's flyweight rankings.

Mixed martial arts career

Early career
Calvillo made her amateur debut in 2012, and garnered a 5–1 record over the next four years.

Ultimate Fighting Championship
In her UFC debut, Calvillo accepted a ten-day notice fight against Amanda Cooper at UFC 209 on March 4, 2017. She won the fight via submission in the first round.

Following her successful UFC debut, she was asked to join the main card of UFC 210 against promotional newcomer Pearl Gonzalez. Gonzalez was ruled out of the contest after the NYSAC said she could not fight because of her breast implants, which are banned among combat-sports competitors. Later the decision was reversed and the fight was allowed to go on as scheduled. Calvillo won the fight by third round rear-naked choke submission.

Calvillo faced Joanne Calderwood in a strawweight bout on July 16, 2017, at UFC Fight Night 113. At the weigh-ins, Calderwood came in at 118 pounds, two pounds over the strawweight limit of 116 lbs. As a result, she was fined 20% of her purse, which went to Calvillo and their bout proceeded as scheduled at a catchweight fight. Calvillo won the fight via unanimous decision.

Calvillo faced Carla Esparza on December 30, 2017, at UFC 219. She lost the fight by unanimous decision, with all three judges scoring the bout 29-28 for Esparza. After the fight, it was revealed that Calvillo had failed an in-competition drug test for marijuana metabolites. As a result, she was suspended by USADA for 6 months with the ability to reduce the suspension to 3 months by completing a USADA approved drug awareness program. The Nevada Athletic Commission later extended this to 9 months.

Calvillo faced Poliana Botelho on November 17, 2018, at UFC Fight Night 140. At the weigh-ins, Calvillo weighed in at 118 pounds, 2 pounds over the strawweight non-title fight limit of 116 pounds. She was fined 20 percent of her purse, which went to her opponent, Botelho, and the bout proceeded at catchweight. She won the fight via a rear-naked choke in round one.

Calvillo next faced Cortney Casey on February 17, 2019, at UFC on ESPN: Ngannou vs. Velasquez. She won the fight by unanimous decision.

Calvillo was scheduled to face Lívia Renata Souza on July 13, 2019, at UFC Fight Night 155. However, on June 7, 2019 it was reported that Calvillo was forced to pull out of the bout due to a broken foot and she was replaced by Brianna Van Buren.

Calvillo was scheduled to face Cláudia Gadelha on December 7, 2019, at UFC on ESPN 7. However, on October 22, 2019, it was announced that Gadelha was forced to withdraw from the bout due to broken finger and torn ligament, and she was replaced by Marina Rodriguez. After three rounds of fighting, the bout ended with a majority draw.

Calvillo was scheduled to face Antonina Shevchenko on April 25, 2020. However, on April 9, Dana White, the president of UFC announced that this event was postponed to a future date. Instead Calvillo faced Jessica Eye on June 13, 2020 in the main event at UFC on ESPN: Eye vs. Calvillo. At the weigh-ins on June 12, Eye missed weight, weighing in at 126.25 pounds, a quarter pound over the non-title flyweight limit of 126 pounds. The bout proceeded as a catchweight bout and Eye was fined 25% of her purse. Calvillo won the fight via unanimous decision.

Calvillo was expected to face Lauren Murphy on October 25, 2020, at UFC 254. However, Calvillo was forced to withdraw the bout for undisclosed reason and she was replaced by promotional newcomer Liliya Shakirova.

Calvillo faced Katlyn Chookagian on November 21, 2020, at UFC 255. She lost the fight via unanimous decision.

Calvillo faced Jéssica Andrade on September 25, 2021, at UFC 266. She lost the fight via technical knockout in round one.

Calvillo faced Andrea Lee on November 13, 2021, at UFC Fight Night 197. Calvillo lost the fight via technical knockout when she opted not to continue after the second round.

Calvillo was scheduled to face Nina Nunes on July 9, 2022, at UFC on ESPN 39. However, the day of the event, Nunes withdrew due to illness and the bout was canceled. The bout was rescheduled to August 13, 2022, on UFC on ESPN: Vera vs. Cruz. Calvillo lost the fight via split decision.

Calvillo is scheduled to face Lupita Godinez on April 8, 2023 at UFC 287.

Championships and accomplishments

Mixed martial arts
MMAjunkie.com
2017 Newcomer of the Year

Mixed martial arts record 

|-
|Loss
|align=center|9–5–1
|Nina Nunes
|Decision (split)
|UFC on ESPN: Vera vs. Cruz
|
|align=center|3
|align=center|5:00
|San Diego, California, United States
|
|-
|Loss
|align=center|9–4–1
|Andrea Lee
|TKO (corner stoppage)
|UFC Fight Night: Holloway vs. Rodríguez
|
|align=center|2
|align=center|5:00
|Las Vegas, Nevada, United States
|
|-
|Loss
|align=center|9–3–1
|Jéssica Andrade
|TKO (punches)
|UFC 266
|
|align=center|1
|align=center|4:54
|Las Vegas, Nevada, United States
|  
|-
|Loss
|align=center|9–2–1
|Katlyn Chookagian
|Decision (unanimous)
|UFC 255
|
|align=center|3
|align=center|5:00
|Las Vegas, Nevada, United States
|
|-
|Win
|align=center|9–1–1
|Jessica Eye
|Decision (unanimous)
|UFC on ESPN: Eye vs. Calvillo
|
|align=center|5
|align=center|5:00
|Las Vegas, Nevada, United States
|
|-
|Draw
|align=center|8–1–1
|Marina Rodriguez
|Draw (majority)
|UFC on ESPN: Overeem vs. Rozenstruik
|
|align=center|3
|align=center|5:00
|Washington, D.C., United States
|
|-
|Win
|align=center|8–1
|Cortney Casey
|Decision (unanimous)
|UFC on ESPN: Ngannou vs. Velasquez
|
|align=center|3
|align=center|5:00
|Phoenix, Arizona, United States
|
|-
|Win
|align=center|7–1
|Poliana Botelho
|Submission (rear-naked choke)
|UFC Fight Night: Magny vs. Ponzinibbio
|
|align=center|1
|align=center|4:48
|Buenos Aires, Argentina
|
|-
|Loss
|align=center|6–1
|Carla Esparza
|Decision (unanimous)
|UFC 219
|
|align=center|3
|align=center|5:00
|Las Vegas, Nevada, United States
| 
|-
|Win
|align=center|6–0
|Joanne Calderwood
|Decision (unanimous)
|UFC Fight Night: Nelson vs. Ponzinibbio
|
|align=center|3
|align=center|5:00
|Glasgow, Scotland
|
|-
|Win
|align=center|5–0
|Pearl Gonzalez
|Submission (rear-naked choke)
|UFC 210
|
|align=center|3
|align=center|3:45
|Buffalo, New York, United States
|
|-
|Win
|align=center|4–0
|Amanda Cooper
|Submission (rear-naked choke)
|UFC 209
|
|align=center|1
|align=center|3:19
|Las Vegas, Nevada, United States
|
|-
|Win
|align=center|3–0
|Montana De La Rosa
|TKO (punches)
|LFA 1
|
|align=center|3
|align=center|2:54
|Dallas, Texas, United States
|
|-
|Win
|align=center|2–0
|Gillian Robertson
|Decision (unanimous)
|Global Knockout 8
|
|align=center|3
|align=center|5:00
|Jackson, California, United States
|
|-
|Win
|align=center|1–0
|Jessica Sanchez-Birch
|TKO (punches)
|Global Knockout 7
|
|align=center|2
|align=center|3:21
|Jackson, California, United States
|

Amateur mixed martial arts record

|-
|Win
|align=center|5–1
|Aspen Ladd
|Decision (unanimous)
|WFC 9 - Mitchell vs. Jara
|
|align=center|3
|align=center|5:00
|Sacramento, California, United States
|
|-
|Loss
|align=center|4–1
|Brenna Larkin
|Decision (unanimous)
|Tuff-N-Uff - Festibrawl 5
|
|align=center|3
|align=center|3:00
|Las Vegas, Nevada, Nevada
|
|-
|Win
|align=center|4–0
|Jeana Pinelli
|Decision (unanimous)
|BTF - 2012 Camo State Championship
|
|align=center|3
|align=center|5:00
|Fremont, California, United States
|
|-
|Win
|align=center|3–0
|Ariene Culbreath
|Submission (rear-naked choke)
|WCS 5 - San Jose Fit Expo
|
|align=center|2
|align=center|1:13
|California, United States
|
|-
|Win
|align=center|2–0
|Stefanie Harrison
|TKO (punches)
|Rocktagon MMA - Elite Series 17
|
|align=center|1
|align=center|1:29
|Salinas, California, United States
|
|-
|Win
|align=center|1–0
|Stefanie Harrison
|KO (punch)
|Rocktagon MMA - Elite Series 14
|
|align=center|1
|align=center|1:15
|Richmond, California, United States
|

See also
 List of current UFC fighters
 List of female mixed martial artists

References

External links
 
 

1987 births
Living people
American female mixed martial artists
Strawweight mixed martial artists
Flyweight mixed martial artists
Mixed martial artists utilizing wrestling
Mixed martial artists utilizing Muay Thai
Mixed martial artists from California
Ultimate Fighting Championship female fighters
Doping cases in mixed martial arts
American Muay Thai practitioners
Female Muay Thai practitioners
American practitioners of Brazilian jiu-jitsu
Female Brazilian jiu-jitsu practitioners
Sportspeople from San Jose, California
American sportspeople in doping cases
21st-century American women